1044 Teutonia, provisional designation , is a stony asteroid from the central regions of the asteroid belt, approximately 16 kilometers in diameter. It was discovered on 10 May 1924, by astronomer Karl Reinmuth at Heidelberg Observatory in southwest Germany. The asteroid was named after the land inhabited by the Teutonic people.

Classification and orbit 

Teutonia orbits the Sun in the central main-belt at a distance of 2.2–2.9 AU once every 4 years and 2 months (1,510 days). Its orbit has an eccentricity of 0.14 and an inclination of 4° with respect to the ecliptic.

Physical characteristics

Lightcurves 

Images of the object made during 2007 were used to produce a light curve that gave a synodic period of 2.84 ± 0.04 h. However, a study made in 2006 gave a period of 3.153 ± 0.003, which can not yet be ruled out. The brightness of the object varied by 0.20 ± 0.03 in magnitude over the course of each rotation.

Diameter and albedo 

According to the surveys carried out by the Infrared Astronomical Satellite IRAS, the Japanese Akari satellite, and NASA's Wide-field Infrared Survey Explorer with its subsequent NEOWISE mission, Teutonia measures between 15.20 and 17.929 kilometers in diameter and its surface has an albedo between 0.2449 and 0.3340. The Collaborative Asteroid Lightcurve Link derives an albedo of 0.3613 and a diameter of 15.30 kilometers based on an absolute magnitude of 10.8.

Naming 

This minor planet was named for the land once inhabited by the Teutons, a Germanic tribe that lived in what is now Jutland. The name was proposed by astronomer Gustav Stracke.

References

External links 
 Asteroid Lightcurve Database (LCDB), query form (info )
 Dictionary of Minor Planet Names, Google books
 Asteroids and comets rotation curves, CdR – Observatoire de Genève, Raoul Behrend
 Discovery Circumstances: Numbered Minor Planets (1)-(5000) – Minor Planet Center
 
 

001044
Discoveries by Karl Wilhelm Reinmuth
Named minor planets
19240510